The Dos Hermanos Islands are two rock formations located off the northern coast of Maira-ira Point in Pagupud, Ilocos Norte, the Philippines. The twin islands are often visited by tourists, and are a natural landmark of Pagudpud.

See also

 List of islands of the Philippines
 List of islands
 Desert island

References

Islands of Ilocos Norte
Uninhabited islands of the Philippines